The 2011–12 Clemson Tigers men's basketball team represented Clemson University during the 2011–12 NCAA Division I men's basketball season. The Tigers, led by second year head coach Brad Brownell, played their home games at Littlejohn Coliseum and were members of the Atlantic Coast Conference.

Roster

Previous season
The Tigers finished the 2010–11 season 22–12 overall, 9–7 in ACC play, and lost in the second round of the NCAA tournament to West Virginia.

Schedule
 
|-
!colspan=9| Exhibition

|-
!colspan=9| Regular season

|-
!colspan=9| ACC tournament

References

Clemson
Clemson Tigers men's basketball seasons